Henry Petersen (1 October 1900 – 24 September 1949) was a Danish athlete. He competed in the pole vault at the 1920 and 1924 Olympics and won a silver medal in 1920, placing fourth in 1924. Petersen won the national pole vault title in 1920–21, 1923 and 1925–27 and improved the national record eight times from 3.69 m in 1919 to 4.03 m in 1925. He also held three national titles in the  sprint relay (1919–20 and 1922) and five in team gymnastics events (between 1921 and 1927). He retired from sport shortly before the 1928 Olympics due to tuberculosis. He was an engineer by profession.

References

External links 
 

1900 births
1949 deaths
Danish male pole vaulters
Olympic silver medalists for Denmark
Athletes (track and field) at the 1920 Summer Olympics
Athletes (track and field) at the 1924 Summer Olympics
Olympic athletes of Denmark
Medalists at the 1920 Summer Olympics
Olympic silver medalists in athletics (track and field)
People from Horsens
Sportspeople from the Central Denmark Region